Weddleville is an unincorporated community in Carr Township, Jackson County, Indiana.

Weddleville was laid out in 1855 by John A. Weddle and others.

Carr High School was listed on the National Register of Historic Places in 2011.

Geography

References

Unincorporated communities in Jackson County, Indiana
Unincorporated communities in Indiana